|}

The Newbury Spring Cup is a flat handicap horse race in Great Britain open to horses aged four years or older. It is run at Newbury over a distance of 1 mile, and it is scheduled to take place each year in April.

Winners since 1988

See also
 Horse racing in Great Britain
 List of British flat horse races

References

Racing Post:

Flat races in Great Britain
Newbury Racecourse
Open mile category horse races